Seavington St. Mary is a 0.3 hectare geological Site of Special Scientific Interest near the village of Seavington St Mary in Somerset, notified in 1971.

Extensive exposures through much of the Inferior Oolite. This is the most westerly outcrop of this formation in England. It is thus of considerable importance in interpreting the local stratigraphy and sedimentology in relation to the palaeogeography of south-west England in Middle Jurassic times. A valuable Aalenian - Bajocian locality affording a prime educational and research facility.

Sources
English Nature citation sheet for the site (accessed 10 August 2006)

External links
English Nature website (SSSI information)

Sites of Special Scientific Interest in Somerset
Sites of Special Scientific Interest notified in 1971